The Hunters in the Snow, also known as The Return of the Hunters, is a 1565 oil-on-wood painting by Pieter Bruegel the Elder. The Northern Renaissance work is one of a series of works, five of which still survive, that depict different times of the year. The painting is in the collection of the Kunsthistorisches Museum in Vienna, Austria. This scene is set in the depths of winter during December/January.

Background and origins
The Hunters in the Snow, and the series to which it belongs, are in the medieval and early Renaissance tradition of the Labours of the Months: depictions of various rural activities and work understood by a spectator in Breugel's time as representing the different months or times of the year.

Description and composition
The painting shows a wintry scene in which three hunters are returning from an expedition accompanied by their dogs.  By appearances the outing was not successful; the hunters appear to trudge wearily, and the dogs appear downtrodden and miserable. One man carries the "meager corpse of a fox" illustrating the paucity of the hunt. In front of the hunters in the snow are the footprints of a rabbit or hare—which has escaped or been missed by the hunters. The overall visual impression is one of a calm, cold, overcast day; the colors are muted whites and grays, the trees are bare of leaves, and wood smoke hangs in the air. Several adults and a child prepare food at an inn with an outside fire. Of interest are the jagged mountain peaks which do not exist in Belgium or Holland.

The painting prominently depicts crows sitting in the denuded trees and a magpie flies in the upper centre of the scene.  Bruegel sometimes uses these two species of birds to indicate an ill-omen as in Dutch culture magpies are associated with the Devil.

The landscape itself is a flat-bottomed valley (a river meanders through it) with jagged peaks visible on the far side. A watermill is seen with its wheel frozen stiff. In the distance, figures ice skate, play bandy (before it became an organized sport), and play eisstock (similar to curling) on a frozen lake; they are rendered as silhouettes.

Interpretation and reception

The 1560s was a time of religious revolution in the Netherlands, and Bruegel (and possibly his patron) may be attempting to portray an ideal of what country life used to be or what they wish it to be.

Writing in the "opinion" section of Nature, art historian Martin Kemp points out that Old Masters are popular subjects for Christmas cards and states that "probably no 'secular' subject is more popular than ... Hunters in the Snow".

The painting is the subject of modernist poet William Carlos Williams's ekphrastic poem "The Hunter in The Snow". Hunters in the Snow is used extensively in Russian director Andrei Tarkovsky's films Solaris (1972) and Mirror (1974), and in Lars von Trier's 2011 film Melancholia. It appears also in Alain Tanner's film Dans la ville blanche (1983). It was an inspiration for Roy Andersson's 2014 film A Pigeon Sat on a Branch Reflecting on Existence, is the basis for the first frame of Abbas Kiarostami's 24 Frames (2017), and was a topic of the 1980 television series 100 Great Paintings.

The surviving Months of the Year cycle are:

References

 Kunsthistorisches Museum website
 Hunters in the snow painting on Google Art Project

Further reading
 (see index)

1565 paintings
Birds in art
Dogs in art
Hunting in art
Paintings by Pieter Bruegel the Elder
Paintings in the collection of the Kunsthistorisches Museum
Works about melancholia